The Queens Pride Parade and Multicultural Festival is the second oldest and second largest pride parade in New York City. It is held annually in the neighborhood of Jackson Heights, located in the New York City borough of Queens. The parade was founded by Daniel Dromm and Maritza Martinez to raise the visibility of the LGBTQ community in Queens and memorialize Jackson Heights resident Julio Rivera. Queens also serves as the largest transgender hub in the Western hemisphere and is the most ethnically diverse urban area in the world.

History 

Two events spurred the LGTBQ community of Jackson Heights to host its annual pride march: the first was a hate crime; the second, the rejection of a multicultural curriculum by Queens Community School District 24.
On July 2, 1990, Julio Rivera, a 29-year old gay Puerto Rican bartender, was murdered in the schoolyard of P.S. 69 in Jackson Heights. After a night of heavy drinking, three young white men (Erik Brown, Esat Bici, and Daniel Doyle) who were out hunting for "a drug dealer or a drug addict or a homo out cruising," lured Rivera into the schoolyard and punched, clubbed, hammered, and finally stabbed him to death.  In response to his murder, Rivera's relatives and friends mobilized New York City's lesbian, gay, bisexual and transgender community, holding a candlelight vigil at the site of the murder and putting pressure on the police department to find his killers.

In 1992, Queens Community School District 24 rejected the Multicultural Children of the Rainbow Curriculum proposed by Chancellor Joseph A. Fernandez of the New York City public school system. Children of the Rainbow was designed to teach children acceptance of New York City's diverse communities, but the president of District 24's board, Mary A. Cummins, called the guide "dangerously misleading lesbian/homosexual propaganda," using three among the hundreds of the recommended readings, Heather Has Two Mommies, Daddy’s Roommate, and Gloria Goes to Gay Pride, as proof. In response, Daniel Dromm, a public school teacher in District 24 Community proposed a family-friendly celebratory parade that would allow the Queens LGBTQ community to become visible. As he explained six years later, “I wanted people to know that lesbians and gay men were their family, friends, and neighbors.”On June 6, 1993, the Inaugural Queens Lesbian and Gay Parade and Block Party Festival took place in Jackson Heights. Co-organized by Daniel Dromm and Cuban-born LGBTQ rights activist Maritza Martinez, it became the first successful event to be organized in any New York City borough outside Manhattan. Some 1,000 marchers participated, and thousands of spectators attended. More than a dozen LGBTQ organizations sponsored the event. City Councilman Tom Duane, Assemblywoman Deborah Glick, and activist Jeanne Manford served as Grand Marshals. A mostly local affair, the march included two separate moments of silence. At 1:25pm, the Grand Marshals of the parade called for moment of silence in front of P.S. 69 to memorialize Julio Rivera and all victims of lesbian/gay bashings. Then at 3:00pm, a second moment of silence was taken during the music festival to remember those who had died of AIDS.

In 2015, Mayor Bill de Blasio became the first New York City mayor to serve as a Grand Marshal.

Now an annual tradition, Queens Pride has attracted crowds of over 40,000 people, and is supported by politicians and sponsors such as the Queens Library, Uber, Go Magazine, Gaytravel.com, AIDS Center of Queens County, Gay City News, and Ibis Styles Hotels.

One iconic Queens Pride participant was Ms. Colombia, who Daniel Dromm characterized as "a real Jackson Heights character." A profile from the arts organization Visual AIDS describes her as being a "colorful and beloved performance artist." Born José Oswaldo Gómez, Ms. Colombia moved from Medellín to the United States in search for safety, as individuals who did not dress in gender specific ways were common targets for hate crimes in Colombia.  After being diagnosed with HIV in the 1980s, Gómez determined to live "day by day," becoming Ms. Colombia, whose colorful dressing and parade-walking became a celebration of being alive. On October 4, 2018, New York City officials mourned her passing.

Queens Lesbian & Gay Pride Committee 
The parade's organizer, the Queens Lesbian & Gay Pride Committee (Queens Pride), is a 501(c)(3) not-for-profit volunteer organization founded in 1992 that coordinates LGBTQ pride events in Queens, New York. In addition to the annual Pride Parade and Multicultural Festival, Queens Pride fosters youth programming and a Winter Pride Dinner Dance.

Grand Marshals of the Queens Pride March 
1993

 NYC Council representative Tom Duane
 Assemblywoman Deborah Glick
 Activist Jeanne Manford, founder of Parents, Families and Friends of Lesbians and Gays (PFLAG)

1994
NYC Comptroller Alan Hevesi
Activist John J. Won, leader in the gay youth movement and AIDS education
Activist Candice Boyce, leader of African Ancestral Lesbians United for Societal Change

1995 

 NYC Public Advocate Mark Green
1994 NYS Attorney General Candidate Judge Karen Burstein 
Activist Ed Sedarbaum, founder of Queens Gays and Lesbians United (Q-GLU)

1996
 Borough of Manhattan President Ruth Messinger
Activist Brendan Fay
 Publisher Jean Sidebottom

1997

NYC Comptroller H. Carl McCall
Activist Janice Thom
Activist  Franklin G. Fry

1998 

 NYC Council representative for Manhattan's Lower East Side Margarita Lopez
 NYC Council representative for Harlem and South Bronx Phil Reed 
 Activist Betty Santoro

2000 

 Transgender activist Barbra Ann Perina, Program Director of Lambda Treatment and Recovery Program
 Activist Angeline Acain, publisher of Gay Parent and Ripe Magazines

2001 

 CEO of West End Records Mel Cheren
 LGBT organization for senior citizens Sage/Queens
 LGBT organization for straight and questioning youth under 21 years of age Generation Q

2010 

 NYC Council representative Daniel Dromm 
 NYC Council representative  Jimmy Van Bramer

2015

New York City mayor Bill De Blasio
 APICHA Community Health Center

2016

 Council representative Julissa Ferreras-Copeland
 Activist Jessica Stern, OutRight Action International Executive Director
 The AIDS Center of Queens County

2017

 Transgender activist and firefighter Brooke Guinan
 Activist Krishna Stone, director of Community Relations at Gay Men's Health Crisis
 Geng Le, a leader for LGBT equality in the People's Republic of China and creator of Blued
 American Civil Liberties Union (ACLU)

2018

 Queens Borough President Melinda Katz
 Activist Elijah Betts, the youngest non-binary-identified leader at the LGBTQ organization Generation Q

2019

 Singer-songwriter Candy Samples
 Activist Jesse Pasackow who, with Candy Samples, created the Candy Wrappers AIDS Walk New York City team
 Queens Pride Lions Club
 Mirror Beauty Cooperative, New York City's first trans-Latinx run business
2022

 City Council Speaker Adrienne Adams
 Colectivo Intercultural TRANSgrediendo
 Caribbean Equality Project

See also 
 LGBT culture in New York City
 New York City Drag March
 New York City Pride March

References 

Parades in New York City
LGBT culture in New York City
1993 establishments in New York City
Recurring events established in 1993
Jackson Heights, Queens
Pride parades in the United States
1993 in LGBT history